Bennett High School may refer to:

Bennett High School (Buffalo, New York)
Bennett High School (Bennett, Colorado)
James M. Bennett High School, Salisbury, Maryland